The Romanian Orthodox Metropolis of Western and Southern Europe is an autonomous metropolis of the Romanian Orthodox Church centered in Paris. It has its origins in the Romanian Orthodox Diocese of Western Europe created by Visarion Puiu.

Bibliography

Romanian Orthodox dioceses